CDH may refer to:

CDH Investments, a Chinese asset management firm
 Central DuPage Hospital, Illinois, U.S.A.
 Centre Démocrate Humaniste, a Belgian political party
 Cloudera's Distribution including Apache Hadoop
 The Computational Diffie-Hellman assumption, that a certain mathematical problem is hard
 Congenital diaphragmatic hernia
 Cretin-Derham Hall, school in St. Paul, Minnesota, U.S.A.
 Cellobiose dehydrogenase, a plant enzyme